Zawada  is a village in the administrative district of Gmina Mierzęcice, within Będzin County, Silesian Voivodeship, in southern Poland.

The village has a population of 159.

References

Villages in Będzin County